Schöfflisdorf-Oberweningen railway station is a railway station in the municipalities of Schöfflisdorf in the Swiss canton of Zurich. The station takes its name from the adjoining municipalities of Schöfflisdorf and Oberweningen. It is located on the Wehntal railway line, and is served by Zurich S-Bahn line S15. The old station building from the Swiss Northeastern Railway is still standing, but is disused. A waiting room and bike racks are from 1990 when the Zurich S-Bahn was inaugurated. In the front of the station is the turning loop for the bus line 555 connecting Oberweningen and Schleinikon to the station. The bus line is only operating Monday through Friday during peak hours.

Services 
The following services stop at Niederweningen:

References

External links 
 
 

Railway stations in the canton of Zürich
Swiss Federal Railways stations
Oberweningen